Disco 3 is the third remix album by English synth-pop duo Pet Shop Boys, released on 3 February 2003 by Parlophone. The album consists of five remixes of songs and B-sides from their previous album, Release, three new tracks, a new recording of "Positive Role Model" from their 2001 musical Closer to Heaven, and a cover version of "Try It (I'm in Love with a Married Man)", originally by Oh Romeo, the band of former Pet Shop Boys producer Bobby Orlando. "Positive Role Model" also appeared on the Germany-only single "London" in 2002 as a B-side.

"If Looks Could Kill" and "Try It..." debuted during a 2002 Peel Session, along with "A Powerful Friend", a song that remained unreleased until it was uploaded to the "Exclusives Tracks" section of the band's official website. It was also released as the b-side to their 2010 single "Love Life".

As of May 2006, the album had sold 42,000 copies in the United States.

Track listing

Notes
  signifies a remixer and additional producer
  signifies an original producer
  signifies a main producer and remixer

Sample credits
 "Positive Role Model" includes a sample of "You're the First, the Last, My Everything" by Barry White.

Personnel
Credits adapted from the liner notes of Disco 3.

Pet Shop Boys
 Neil Tennant
 Chris Lowe

Additional musicians
 Pete Gleadall – programming 
 Chris Zippel – programming ; additional keyboards 
 Christian Hayes – guitars 
 Mark Refoy – guitars 
 Robert Matt – Steinway piano

Technical
 Pet Shop Boys – production ; remix ; original production 
 Bob Kraushaar – mixing, engineering 
 Pete Gleadall – engineering ; mixing ; vocal recording 
 Chris Zippel – production, engineering ; original production, original engineering ; mixing 
 Florian Richter – mixing 
 Kai Diener – mixing 
 Felix da Housecat – remix, additional production 
 Tom Stephan – remix, additional production 
 Piet Blank – remix, additional production 
 Jaspa Jones – remix, additional production 
 Andy Kaufhold – remix, additional production

Artwork
 Scott King – sleeve art direction, design
 Wolfgang Tillmans – photography

Charts

Notes

References

2003 remix albums
Parlophone remix albums
Pet Shop Boys remix albums
Sequel albums